The Croatia national wheelchair handball team is the national wheelchair handball team of Croatia and is controlled by the Croatian Handball Federation.

Competitive record

European Wheelchair Handball Nations’ Tournament

References

External links
Official website
IHF profile
EHF Team Page

National wheelchair handball teams
Handball in Croatia
Handball-Wheelchair